Piros or Piroš is a Hungarian surname, it means 'red'. Notable people with the surname include:

Andrea Piros (born 1966), Swiss fencer
Kamil Piroš (born 1978), Czech ice hockey player
László Piros (1917–2006), Hungarian politician and military officer
Zsombor Piros (born 1999), Hungarian tennis player
Piros (born 1989), Serbian graffiti and mural artist 

Hungarian-language surnames
Surnames from nicknames